Klaus Eyferth (9 November 1928 – 19 July 2012) was a German psychologist. He was educated at the University of Hamburg, from which he received his diploma in 1954, his doctorate in 1957, and his habilitation in 1964. While at the University of Hamburg, he conducted a study on the IQ scores of the German-raised children of black and white American soldiers stationed in Allied-occupied Germany. This study has since become known as the Eyferth study. In 1973, he joined the faculty of the Technical University of Berlin, where he went on to help establish the Institute for Psychology. A member of the German Psychological Society, he hosted its 1988 conference in Berlin. In 1995, he retired from the Technical University of Berlin; he became an emeritus professor there the following year. He died on 19 July 2012, at the age of 83.

References

German psychologists
1928 births
2012 deaths
Intelligence researchers
University of Hamburg alumni
Academic staff of the Technical University of Berlin